Vladimír Janočko (born 2 December 1976) is a Slovak former professional footballer  who played as an attacking midfielder. He was capped 41 times for the Slovakia national team and scored three goals.

Honours
1. FC Košice
Corgoň Liga: 1997, 1998

Austria Wien
Austrian Bundesliga: 2003, 2006
Austrian Cup: 2003, 2005, 2006

Salzburg
Austrian Bundesliga: 2007, 2009

Individual
Austrian Footballer of the Year: 2002
Slovak Footballer of the Year: 2003

External links

1979 births
Living people
Sportspeople from Košice
Slovak footballers
Slovakia international footballers
Association football midfielders
FC VSS Košice players
FK Austria Wien players
FC Red Bull Salzburg players
Xanthi F.C. players
MFK Zemplín Michalovce players
Slovak Super Liga players
Austrian Football Bundesliga players
Slovak expatriate footballers
Slovak expatriate sportspeople in Greece
Expatriate footballers in Greece
Slovak expatriate sportspeople in Austria
Expatriate footballers in Austria